Wynnella silvicola is a species of fungus in the family Helvellaceae, order Pezizales.

References

Pezizales
Fungi of Europe
Fungi described in 1778